Francesco Lambardi (1587–1642) was a Neapolitan Baroque composer who participated in the staging of feste a ballo with Giovanni Maria Trabaci.  He was born in Naples.

Recordings
Canto d'Amore on Festa teatrale, Thomas Hengelbrock, DHM.

References

1587 births
1642 deaths
Musicians from Naples
Italian male classical composers
Italian Baroque composers
17th-century Italian composers
17th-century male musicians